Battle Creek Transportation Center is an intermodal station in Battle Creek, Michigan, used by Amtrak, Indian Trails and Greyhound Lines. It is at the split between the routes of Amtrak's Blue Water and Wolverine passenger trains. The International Limited, which had started in 1982 as joint operation by Via Rail and Amtrak between Chicago and Toronto, was discontinued in 2004.

The intermodal facility reopened in 2012 following an extensive renovation. New finishes give the depot a fresh, modern appeal, and new canopies and mechanical systems were also installed.

History
The current Amtrak station was built to replace two older train stations, the Battle Creek Grand Trunk Station and the Michigan Central Railroad Depot  (also known as the Penn Central Railway Station). The Michigan Central Railroad depot has been on the National Register of Historic Places since April 16, 1971, while the Grand Trunk Depot has been on the NRHP since 1980.

The Grand Trunk Depot is now the headquarters for the local branch of Community Action and the Michigan Central Railroad Depot  is now a restaurant called Clara's on the River. 

In September 2010, the state of Michigan got $3.6 million from the federal government to refurbish the station, including renovations to parts of the interior and exterior and bringing the station to ADA standards.  On August 3, 2011, a temporary station operated out of a trailer to the northwest of the station building was planned to open while renovations took place for the next nine months.

The new station, which opened on June 12, 2012, features a new entrance and passenger drop-off area, secure long-term parking lot, improved exterior lighting and landscaping. The interior was completely remodeled, with office space for Amtrak and other tenants and an upgraded passenger waiting area.

Eight Amtrak trains serve Battle Creek daily, with three round-trips from Chicago to Detroit/Pontiac on the Wolverine Service, one Blue Water round-trip from Chicago to Port Huron, and Amtrak Thruway Motorcoaches to and from Flint.

References

External links

Battle Creek Amtrak Station (USA Rail Guide – Train Web)
Battle Creek Station (Michigan Passenger Stations)

Amtrak stations in Michigan
Battle Creek, Michigan
Michigan Line
Transportation buildings and structures in Calhoun County, Michigan